Jeffrey Berman is a literary scholar, author, and editor. He is a Distinguished Teaching Professor of English at the University at Albany, SUNY, He is the author or co-author of over twenty books and one hundred and fifty articles, book chapters, and reviews, including Dying to Teach: A Memoir of Love, Loss, and Learning, and Cutting and the Pedagogy of Self-Disclosure. His research interests include literature and psychoanalysis, trauma theory, love and loss, death education, and self-disclosure pedagogy.

Berman holds editorial appointments on several journals, including Psyart, and American Imago. He was the Series Editor for Literature and Psychoanalysis for New York University Press from 1991 to 1997. He served on the Editorial Board of SUNY State University of New York Press from 1995 to 2001.

Education
Berman graduated with a B.A. in English literature from State University of New York at Buffalo in 1967. He then enrolled at Cornell University to pursue an M.A. in English literature, and later completed his Ph.D. there in 1971. Subsequently, he became a Research Scholar at the training institute of the National Psychological Association for Psychoanalysis from 1980 until 1983.

Career
Berman started his academic career at Cornell University as a Teaching Fellow in 1968. This was followed by an appointment as a Lecturer in English. He held an appointment as an Assistant Professor at the State University of New York at Albany in 1973, was promoted to Associate Professor in 1979, and became a Professor in 1988. As of 2007, he is a Distinguished Teaching Professor of English at the University at Albany, SUNY.

Research
Berman’s research works span the fields of literature and psychoanalysis, with a particular focus on the pedagogy of self-disclosure, suicide, trauma, grief, love, and loss, as well as the twentieth century novels.

Self-disclosure pedagogy
Berman has taught numerous courses on love and loss, and recovery and encouraged students to write about their losses. Having characterized the current culture as death denying, he established a classroom environment in which students are allowed to write about their experiences. In his article The Talking Cure and the Writing Cure, he discussed how writing about hopelessness, eating disorders, and suicide could aid students in developing their academic and psychological breakthroughs as well as their ability to recognize conflicts and solve them. In addition to that, he suggested that if instructors understood that death education is primarily about life education, they would be more inclined to permit personal discussions about death in the classroom.

Berman also investigated if literature could work as a trigger and if a student's identification with a sick or dying character in a story is so strong that it jeopardizes his or her health. According to his research, teachers need to develop a responsible pedagogy of risk that is aimed at enabling students to deal with distressing or shameful subjects while keeping them from being anxious, depressed, or suicidal. Later, his research work, Surviving Literary Suicide, examined how suicide is portrayed in the works of six authors, four of whom ultimately committed suicide. In each instance, he analyzed the writer's developing attitude toward suicide, critics' inclination to romanticize fictional suicide, and the influence of writing about suicide on the artist's own life.

Literature and psychoanalysis
Berman’s works have provided a psychoanalytic perspective on twentieth century novels. In his 1985 book The Talking Cure: Literary Representations of Psychoanalysis, he showed how Philip Roth’s discussion of psychoanalysis in Portnoy’s Complaint and My Life as a Man was based on his own analysis with Hans J. Kleinschmidt, who had written about Roth without permission.

Berman addressed the literary and cultural analysis of caregiving in the arts in his writings by focusing on fictional stories like The Death of Ivan Ilyich by Leo Tolstoy, and memoirs such as Mary Gordon’s Circling My Mother, and Ending Ageism. Elaborating on the reasons for the scholarly silence on the art of caregiving, he indicated that either caregivers are too exhausted to write about their experiences, or refuse to reflect on the caregiving experience. In a Times Union interview, he stated that "artistic works of film and literature can often take you to dark places and really show what caregivers are thinking and feeling". His research shows that psychoanalysis can not only aid in our comprehension and management of difficult situations, but it also teaches us that we are accountable for our actions and not our ideas or dreams.

Berman also researched how other memoirists handle the loss of a spouse, particularly by identifying the theme of love and loss in the fictional and nonfiction writings of five memoirists, including C.S. Lewis, and John Bayley. Furthermore, his work, which draws on psychoanalysis, indicated that the memoirists not only paid tribute to their spouses' memories, but also dealt with the terrible feelings associated with losing the person who meant the most to them with writing. Using his personal example, he addressed how, while trying to comprehend his own feelings, he continued to speak about his first wife, Barbara, to his students, and wrote a book about her. This made him disagree with Freud's view on loss and sorrow, according to which mourning must come to a spontaneous end. He believes that everyone has a different foci for love and should not be made to let go. He remarried in 2011.

Matthew Broome in Times Higher Education called Berman’s Mad Muse: The Mental Illness Memoir in a Writer’s Life and Work a "fascinating book," one that "masterfully brings together the writings of seven memoirists of mental illness, and lets the complexity, contrasts and inconsistencies, in their life, work and illnesses, remain."

Sam Meekings noted that Berman’s Writing Widowhood: The Landscapes of Bereavement "makes an important contribution to the field in that it defines and examines a new genre: 'the widowhood memoir'" due to its complete focus on female authors.

Daniel W. Ross commended the use of psychoanalysis in his review of Berman's book, The Talking Cure: Literary Representations of Psychoanalysis, and said, "What makes this book especially valuable is the thoroughness with which Berman examines each writer's work."

Awards and honors
1986-87 – President's Award for Excellence in Teaching and Advising, SUNY-Albany 
1986-87 – Chancellor's Award for Excellence in Teaching, SUNY-Albany 
1988 – Center for the Arts and Humanities Fellowship, SUNY-Albany 
2012 – Named one of America’s Top 300 Professors, Princeton Review 
2014– Honorary Membership, American Psychoanalytic Association 
2017 – American Psychoanalytic Association Book Prize for Confidentiality and Its Discontents, coauthored with Paul Mosher
2021 - The Professor Jeffrey Berman Award, given annually to an English major who demonstrates distinguished academic achievement, particularly for writing on grief and mental health
2022 – Minerva Award, Most Impactful Faculty or Staff Member, University at Albany
2022 – Torch Student Engagement Award, University at Albany

Bibliography

Selected books
Narcissism and the Novel (1992) ISBN 9780814711712
Dying to Teach: A Memoir of Love, Loss, and Learning (2017) ISBN 9780791470091
Writing the Talking Cure: Irvin D. Yalom and the Literature of Psychotherapy (2019) ISBN 9781438473888
Off the Tracks: Cautionary Tales About the Derailing of Mental Health Care, coauthored with Paul Mosher (2019) ISBN 9781949093155
Norman N. Holland: The Dean of American Psychoanalytic Literary Critics (2021) ISBN 9781501372971
The Art of Caregiving in Fiction, Film, and Memoir (2022) ISBN 9781350185364
Psychoanalytic Memoirs (2022) ISBN 9781350338579

Selected articles
Berman, J. (1976). Conrad’s “Lord Jim” and the Enigma of Sublimation. American Imago, 33(4), 380–402. Conrad's "Lord Jim" and the Enigma of Sublimation
Berman, J. (1977). Joseph Conrad: “The Figure behind the Veil.” Journal of Modern Literature, 6(2), 196–208. Joseph Conrad: "The Figure behind the Veil"
Berman, J., & VanWagenen, D. (1977). “UNDER WESTERN EYES”: CONRAD’S DIARY OF A WRITER? Conradiana, 9(3), 269–274. "UNDER WESTERN EYES": CONRAD'S DIARY OF A WRITER?
Berman J. (1979). Equus: "After such little forgiveness, what knowledge?". Psychoanalytic review, 66(3), 407–422.
Berman J. (1987). The search for the father in Amadeus. Psychoanalytic review, 74(4), 561–578.
Berman, J. (2010). The talking cure and the writing cure. Philosophy, Psychiatry, & Psychology, 17(3), 255-257.

References 

Living people
1945 births
Cornell University alumni
University at Buffalo alumni
University at Albany, SUNY faculty